Uhti is a village in Kambja Parish, Tartu County, Estonia. It has a population of 301 (as of 1 September 2010).

Uhti has a station on Tartu–Koidula railway.

Gallery

References

Villages in Tartu County
Kreis Dorpat